Hobson's Pledge is a lobby group in New Zealand that was formed in late September 2016 to oppose affirmative action for Māori people. It is led by conservative politician Don Brash. The group aims to nullify the partnership between the Crown and Māori, remove the Māori electorates, abolish the Waitangi Tribunal, restrict tribal powers and “remove all references in law and in Government policy to Treaty ‘partnership’ and ‘principles’”. It is named after William Hobson, the first Governor of New Zealand and co-author of the Treaty of Waitangi. Hobson’s quote on the day of the first signing of the Treaty, “”, has been used by the group to market their beliefs, with the common translation of the phrase: “we are now one people”.

Hobson’s Pledge is considered to be right-wing, and it has been placed by some on the fringe or alt right. Generally considered divisive, the group has been accused of racism for its calls to abolish affirmative action, which the group call "special rights".

Hobson’s Pledge has also been accused of inciting “racism, hate and the segregation of New Zealand society" by the New Zealand Māori Council. The group itself has fervently denied allegations of racism towards Māori, with leader Don Brash stating in response that he is simply against “race-based privilege”.

Background

The group is led by former National Party and ACT leader Don Brash, who delivered the controversial Orewa Speech in 2004 on race relations in New Zealand. Other key members include Casey Costello who is of Māori and Ngāpuhi heritage. Hobson's Pledge advocates abolishing the allocated Māori seats in the New Zealand Parliament and the Waitangi Tribunal, eliminating race-based affirmative action, and cites the Treaty of Waitangi as evidence that Māori chiefs ceded sovereignty in 1840.

When launched, Hobson's Pledge faced criticism from politicians and reporters, including broadcaster Willie Jackson, former Labour Party leader Andrew Little, and then-Prime Minister John Key.

In early 2018, Hobson's Pledge supported citizens-initiated local body referendums opposing the establishment of Māori wards and constituencies in Palmerston North, Western Bay of Plenty, Whakatāne, Manawatū, and Kaikōura. Local councils in those districts had voted to establish Māori wards. At that time, the Local Electoral Act 2001 allowed referendums to be held on Māori wards or constituencies if requested by a petition signed by 5% of the electors of a city, district, or council.

Subsequently, Māori wards were rejected in local referendums held in Palmerston North (68.8%), Western Bay of Plenty (78.2%), Whakatāne (56.4%), Manawatū (77%), and Kaikōura (80%) on 19 May 2018. The turnout was about 40%. The results were welcomed by some including Hobson's Pledge leader Don Brash and conservative broadcaster Mike Hosking. However, others including Whakatāne mayor Tony Bonne, Labour MPs Willie Jackson and Tāmati Coffey, as well as former Māori Party co-leader Te Ururoa Flavell were dismayed. Left-wing lobby group ActionStation organised a petition calling on the Government to amend the Local Electoral Act's provisions on Māori wards.

In 2020, nine other councils proposed Māori wards. Hobson’s Pledge supported citizens in Tauranga, Whangārei, Kaipara, Northland (regional council), Gisborne, Taupō, Ruapehu, New Plymouth and South Taranaki who organised campaigns to collect signatures. Three days after the Tauranga campaign announced sufficient signatures had been collected to trigger a vote, Local Government Minister Nanaia Mahuta announced that the Local Electoral Act 2001 would be amended to outlaw citizen-referendums on Maori wards. That rendered all petitions null and void. More than 25,000 signatures had been collected. Five areas had petitions validated.

Since 2021, Hobson's Pledge has campaigned against proposed co-governance measures and the He Puapua report, calling the proposals "[a] plan to divide New Zealand governance along racial lines".

Notes

References

External links
Hobson's Pledge website
Hobson's Pledge Facebook
Hobson's Pledge Twitter

Political advocacy groups in New Zealand
Race relations in New Zealand
2016 establishments in New Zealand